Major Henry Brougham (8 July 1888 – ) was an English rugby union and rackets player.

Brougham was born at Wellington College, Berkshire on 8 July 1888, and was educated at that School and at Brasenose College, Oxford.

In 1907 he won the Public Schools Racquets Championships and in the following year reached the semi-final of the Olympic men's singles competition in London to gain a bronze medal. In 1909 he represented Oxford in the annual match against Cambridge University winning in both the singles and doubles.

As a cricketer he had first represented Berkshire in the Minor Counties Championship whilst still at school, and in 1907 he captained the Wellington first XI. He made his first-class debut for Oxford University in 1911 and in the Varsity Match that summer scored a stylish second innings of 84, which helped to turn a close match decisively in Oxford's favour. The following year he also represented the Minor Counties against the South African tourists.

Although he was never a particularly prominent rugby player either school or University, he caught the attention of the England selectors after a number of fine performances on the wing for Harlequin F.C. during the 1911-12 season, and marked his international debut with a try in an 8-0 victory over Wales at Twickenham in January 1912. He played in all four Tests in that season's Five Nations tournament scoring further tries against Ireland and France.

On the outbreak of the First World War in 1914 he gained a commission in the Royal Artillery and was posted to France in 1915, eventually attaining the rank of Major. After being caught in a German gas attack in 1917 he was invalided out of active service. In 1918 he contracted tuberculosis whilst commanding a battery in Northern Ireland and never fully recovered his health. He died on 18 February 1923 at La Croix, France from the effects of phthisis.

References

External links 
 profile
 Cricinfo

1888 births
1923 deaths
Racquets players
Olympic racquets players of Great Britain
Racquets players at the 1908 Summer Olympics
Olympic bronze medallists for Great Britain
English rugby union players
England international rugby union players
English cricketers
Oxford University cricketers
Royal Artillery officers
British Army personnel of World War I
People educated at Wellington College, Berkshire
Alumni of Brasenose College, Oxford
Minor Counties cricketers
Berkshire cricketers
Oxford and Cambridge Universities cricketers
Medalists at the 1908 Summer Olympics
20th-century deaths from tuberculosis
Tuberculosis deaths in France
Rugby union players from Berkshire